Eduardo Villanueva District is one of seven districts of the province San Marcos in Peru.

References